= Włocławker Sztyme =

- Founded: 1930
- Ceased publication: 1939
- Language: Yiddish language
- OCLC number: 173850905

Włocławker Sztyme (Yiddish: װלאצלאװקער שטימע, 'Voice of Włocławek') was a Yiddish language weekly newspaper published from the Polish of Włocławek 1930–1939. It was one of the longest-running Yiddish newspapers in the city. Zyskind Izbicki, A. Lichtensztajn and Israel Mordechai Biderman were editors of the newspaper. The newspaper carried the by-line 'Weekly Paper for Włocławek and surroundings'.
